Sister Nivedita University is a private university located in New Town, Kolkata. It was established by the Sister Nivedita University Act, 2017. It is named after Sister Nivedita, a disciple of Swami Vivekananda. Concerns have been raised about the financial stability of the university following repeated demands to students to pay fees up-front on an ad hoc basis.

References

Private universities in India
Universities in Kolkata
2017 establishments in West Bengal